The Farwell Mill is an historic former mill complex at 244 Lisbon Street (Maine State Route 196) in Lisbon, Maine.  Built in 1872, it is a fine example of a cotton mill built at the height of the Industrial Revolution.  It was listed on the National Register of Historic Places in 1985.  It is now residential housing.

Description and history
The Farwell Mill is located in central Lisbon, at the junction of Village and Lisbon Streets and on the western bank of the Sabattus River.  It is a large and sprawling L-shaped brick three-story structure.  The building is minimally decorated, with corbelling at the cornice below the gable roof, and a four-story tower at the southwestern end whose top level has paired round-arch Italianate windows and a shallow-pitch hip roof with a broad eave.  The complex was originally larger, with four-story additions to the south and west, but these have been demolished.  Just north of the main building is a small single-story gas works building, one of the few of its type surviving in the state.

The mill was built in 1872 by Nathaniel Farwell, a businessman with textile-related interests all over New England.  This was the only full-scale textile operation he owned.  It was built using the water privilege of one of Maine's earliest woolen mills, established in 1808, and expanded using a second water privilege just downstream that originally had a grist mill.  Farwell's mill was reported to have a capacity of 12,000 spindles, and was an economic mainstay of the otherwise rural region for many years.

See also
National Register of Historic Places listings in Androscoggin County, Maine

References

Industrial buildings and structures on the National Register of Historic Places in Maine
Buildings and structures in Androscoggin County, Maine
Lisbon, Maine
Industrial buildings completed in 1872
National Register of Historic Places in Androscoggin County, Maine
Cotton mills in the United States
1872 establishments in Maine